The Europe/Africa Zone will be one of the three regional zones of the 2019 Davis Cup.

In the Europe/Africa Zone there are three different tiers, called groups. The winners of the Group I ties in September will earn a place in the 2020 Davis Cup Qualifiers, while the remaining nations in Groups I and II will be allocated a place within their region depending on their position in the Nations Ranking.

Participating nations
<onlyinclude>

Seeds: 

Remaining nations:

Results summary

Results

Romania vs. Zimbabwe

South Africa vs. Bulgaria

Denmark vs. Turkey

Morocco vs. Lithuania

Egypt vs. Slovenia

Norway vs. Georgia

References

External links

Americas Zone Group II
Davis Cup Europe/Africa Zone
Davis Cup Europe/Africa Zone Group II
Davis Cup Europe/Africa Zone Group II
Davis Cup Europe/Africa Zone Group II
Davis Cup Europe/Africa Zone Group II